This is a list of television programs formerly and currently broadcast by the Canadian television channel Showcase.

Current programming

Dramas
NCIS (2009)
All American (2018)
Roswell, New Mexico (2019)
Pennyworth (2019)
FBI (2020)
FBI: Most Wanted (2020)
Temple (2020)
Departure (reruns; 2020)
Chucky (2021)
Dr. Death (September 12, 2021)
9-1-1
NCIS: Los Angeles
NCIS: Hawaii
Bel-Air (February 14, 2022)
Tom Swift (2022)
The Midwich Cuckoos (2022)
CSI: Vegas (2022)
A Friend of the Family (October 17, 2022)
The Lazarus Project (October 20, 2022)

Comedies
A.P. Bio (2021)
We Are Lady Parts (June 9, 2021)
MacGruber (January 9, 2022)
Killing It (May 31, 2022)
The Resort (2022)

Repeats of ended series
 Andromeda (2007–11; 2022)
 Border Security: Canada's Front Line
 The Outer Limits (2020)
 Private Eyes
 Travelers (2016–17)

Uncoming programming
 Starship Troopers (2023)
 Westworld (TV series) (2023)
 Fast & Furious Spy Racers (TBA)

Former programming

References

External links
 Showcase

Showcase